James Fredrick Brown (1886 – 1939) was an English footballer who played in the Football League for Stoke and West Bromwich Albion.

Career
Brown was born in Brierley Hill and started his career at non-league Kidderminster Harriers before he joined League side Stoke in 1906. He played as an inside forward playing in 28 games scoring 11 goals. When Stoke left the league Brown joined West Bromwich Albion scoring once in eight matches and then re-joined Kidderminster Harriers and played for Willenhall Swifts.

Career statistics
Source:

References

1878 births
1939 deaths
People from Brierley Hill
English footballers
Association football inside forwards
Kidderminster Harriers F.C. players
Stoke City F.C. players
West Bromwich Albion F.C. players
Willenhall F.C. players
English Football League players